International Benchrest Shooters (IBS) is as a governing body for benchrest shooting that is mainly active in the USA.

Disciplines 
Competitions within IBS are divided into the categories Group which are benchrest disciplines, and Long Range which bears some resemblance to F-Class competitions.

Group
 Benchrest 100 yard (Group or Score)
 Benchrest 200 yard (Group or Score)
 Benchrest 300 yard (Group or Score)

Long Range
 Long Range 600 yard
 Long Range 1000 yard

Targets 
IBS uses several different target types for different distances and disciplines.

IBS 100 yard target Measures , and has black lines on white paper.
IBS 200 yard target Measures , and has black lines on white paper.
IBS 300 yard target Measures , and has red lines on white paper.
IBS 1000 yard target Measures , and has blue lines on white paper, as well as a blue bullseye to make it easier to spot impacts on the paper targets from a distance.

Records 
The record was set shooting the 6mmBR Ackley Improved cartridge in good weather conditions, and the group was even centered in the X-ring. The IBS record from 2007 measured , which corresponds to an angular size of 0.133 moa or 0.038 mrad.

See also 
 List of shooting sports organizations
 World Benchrest Shooting Federation, a competing benchrest shooting governing body

References

External links 
 Official webpage of the International Benchrest Shooters
 IBS on Accurate Shooter.com
 Highlights from the International Benchrest Shooters Association (IBS) 1,000-yard Nationals at Midwest Benchrest range in Yukon, Montana by the Houston Herald

Shooting sports organizations
Rifle shooting sports